The 15 September 2008 Balad Ruz bombing occurred on 15 September 2008 in Balad Ruz, Diyala when a suicide bomber walked into and detonated herself at an Iftar banquet being held in the home of a policeman in celebration of his release from American detention at Camp Bucca. The attack killed 22 and injured 32. Some of the wounded were taken to a joint US-Iraqi base nearby for treatment. 12 were killed in two car bombings in central Baghdad.

See also
List of terrorist incidents, 2008

External links 

 Suicide bombing kills 22 in Iraq

2008 murders in Iraq
Suicide bombings in Iraq
Mass murder in 2008
Balad Ruz
Terrorist incidents in Iraq in 2008
September 2008 crimes